Scott Davis was the defending champion, but did not compete this year.

Marty Davis won the title by defeating David Pate 6–1, 6–2 in the final.

Seeds

Draw

Finals

Top half

Bottom half

References

External links
 Official results archive (ATP)
 Official results archive (ITF)

Seiko Super Tennis Hawaii
Seiko Super Tennis Hawaii
Seiko Super Tennis Hawaii
Seiko Super Tennis Hawaii
Hawaii Open